Peire de Ladils de Bazas (fl.  1325–1355) was a Gascon troubadour associated with the Consistori del Gay Saber in Toulouse. He was from Bazas in the Gironde and he served as advocate for the Cathédrale Saint-Jean-Baptiste. His surviving work comprises four cansos, three dansas, and two partimens.

In 1340 he composed a political partimen with Raimon de Cornet. He, and presumably Raimon also, was apparently well-read in the romantic literature of his time. His partimen directed to Raimon contains references to Charlemagne, Roland, Jaufre, Launcelot, Gawain, and Matfre Ermengaud:
Mossen Ramons, Carle, Rotlan, Jaufre,
ni Lansalot, ni Galvan, ni Matfre
no vi luns oms ferm guerreiar d'assier
mielhs que faran li Frances dreyturier
ab Lengadoc, si no.y ve passiensa.

References
Aubrey, Elizabeth (1989). "References to Music in Old Occitan Literature." Acta Musicologica, 61:2 (May–August), pp. 110–149.
Dictionnaire de l'Occitan Médiéval, DOM en ligne / Bibliographie (PLad)
Lewent, Kurt (1946). "The Troubadours and the Romance of Jaufre". Modern Philology, 43:3 (February), pp. 153–169.

Gascons
14th-century French troubadours